Gittos is a surname. Notable people with the surname include:

 Austen Gittos (1923–1986), New Zealand fencer, brother of Murray
 Marianne Gittos (1830–1908), Wesleyan mission worker
 Murray Gittos (1920–2014), New Zealand fencer